FC Bayern Munich did not win any trophies in the 2003–04 season, but nevertheless qualified for the next years' Champions League. The biggest disappointment was losing 3–1 at home to champions Werder Bremen at the end of the season, being three goals down after just 35 minutes. New signing Roy Makaay scored 23 league goals, adapting smoothly to Bundesliga, but the defensive performances were not good enough to overhaul Werder Bremen at the end of the season.

Results

Bundesliga

League results

DFB-Pokal

DFB-Ligapokal

Champions League

Group stage results

League results

Knockout stage results

Round of 16

Team statistics

Squad statistics

Squad, appearances and goals

Minutes played

Discipline

Bookings

Suspensions

Transfers

In
First Team

Out

References

FC Bayern Munich seasons
Bayern Munich